In the brain, the corpora quadrigemina (Latin for "quadruplet bodies") are the four colliculi—two inferior, two superior—located on the tectum of the dorsal aspect of the midbrain. They are respectively named the inferior and superior colliculus.

The corpora quadrigemina are reflex centers involving vision and hearing. It consists of groups of nerve cells-grey matter scattered in white matter. It basically connects the forebrain and the hind brain. It has four corpora quadrigemina which are the reflex centres of eye movement and auditory responses. The superior part of corpora quadrigemina are called superior colliculi, and inferior part as inferior colliculi.

Additional images

References

External links
 SUNY Niagara
 Diagram

 
Midbrain
Tectum